HMS Tuna has been the name of more than one ship of the British Royal Navy, and may refer to:

 , a torpedo boat purchased ca. 1915 and sold in 1920
 , a storeship requisitioned 1940–1941
 , a submarine commissioned in 1940 and scrapped in 1945

Tuna